Keith Peters (born 25 January 1986) is a Papua New Guinean former professional rugby league footballer who played for the Penrith Panthers in the NRL. Peters had also captained Papua New Guinea at international level.

Peters moved from Papua New Guinea to Australia in 1993 aged 7 and played his junior rugby league for Cambridge Park. He attended Patrician Brothers College Blacktown until 2004. He has played several games for the Penrith Panthers, but in 2009 spent most of his time with their feeder club Windsor.

Peters was named in the Papua New Guinea training squad for the 2008 Rugby League World Cup.

Peters was named in the PNG squad for the 2008 Rugby League World Cup. Peters was named as part of the Papua New Guinea squad for the 2009 Pacific Cup.

References

External links
Penrith Panthers squad

1986 births
Living people
Australian rugby league players
Newtown Jets NSW Cup players
Papua New Guinea national rugby league team players
Papua New Guinean emigrants to Australia
Papua New Guinean rugby league players
Penrith Panthers players
People from the National Capital District (Papua New Guinea)
Rugby league five-eighths
Rugby league halfbacks
Rugby league hookers
Windsor Wolves players